These are the rosters of all participating teams at the men's water polo tournament at the 2020 Summer Olympics in Tokyo. The twelve national teams were required to submit squads of 12 players. Additionally, teams could name one alternate player. In the event that a player on the submitted squad list suffered an injury or illness, that player would be able to be replaced by the player in the alternate list. On 3 July 2021, the International Olympic Committee (IOC) confirmed that there was a change for the 2020 Summer Olympics, allowing all 13 water polo players named to be available on the roster, with 12 being named for each match. This change was implemented due to the challenges of the COVID-19 pandemic. As of 2 August 2021, all players competed in the men's tournament.

Abbreviations

Group A

Greece

Greece's final squad was announced on 3 July 2021.

Head coach: Thodoris Vlachos

Note: Age as of 23 July 2021Source: Greece Men | Tokyo 2020 Olympics

Hungary

Hungary's final squad was announced on 29 June 2021.

Head coach: Tamás Märcz

Note: Age as of 23 July 2021Source: Hungary Men | Tokyo 2020 Olympics

Italy

Italy's final squad was announced on 2 July 2021.

Head coach: Sandro Campagna

Note: Age as of 23 July 2021Source: Italy Men | Tokyo 2020 Olympics

Japan

Japan's final squad was announced on 19 May 2021.

Head coach: Yoji Omoto

Note: Age as of 23 July 2021Source: Japan Men | Tokyo 2020 Olympics

South Africa

South Africa's squad was announced on 24 June 2021. Roarke Olver was replaced by Timothy Rezelman.

Head coach: Paul Martin

Note: Age as of 23 July 2021Source: South Africa Men | Tokyo 2020 Olympics

United States

The United States' final squad was announced on 2 July 2021.

Head coach:  Dejan Udovičić

Note: Age as of 23 July 2021Source: United States Men | Tokyo 2020 Olympics

Group B

Australia

Australia's final squad was announced on 1 July 2021.

Head coach:  Elvis Fatović

Note: Age as of 23 July 2021Source: Australia Men | Tokyo 2020 Olympics

Croatia

Croatia's final squad was announced on 8 July 2021.

Head coach: Ivica Tucak

Note: Age as of 23 July 2021Source: Croatia Men | Tokyo 2020 Olympics

Kazakhstan

Head coach:  Nemanja Knežević

Note: Age as of 23 July 2021Source: Kazakhstan Men | Tokyo 2020 Olympics

Montenegro

Montenegro's final squad was announced on 8 July 2021.

Head coach: Vladimir Gojković

Note: Age as of 23 July 2021Source: Montenegro Men | Tokyo 2020 Olympics

Serbia

Serbia's final squad was announced on 8 July 2021.

Head coach: Dejan Savić

Note: Age as of 23 July 2021Source: Serbia Men | Tokyo 2020 Olympics

Spain

Spain's final squad was announced on 9 July 2021.

Head coach: David Martín

Note: Age as of 23 July 2021Source: Spain Men | Tokyo 2020 Olympics

Team statistics

Average age

Average height

Number of left-handed players

Player statistics

Age records

Coach statistics

Age

See also
 Water polo at the 2020 Summer Olympics – Women's team rosters

References

Sources
 Water Polo – Athlete Profiles | Tokyo 2020 Olympics 
 Water Polo – Olympic Reports | Tokyo 2020 Olympics
 Water Polo – Official Results Book | Tokyo 2020 Olympics (archive)
 Water Polo – Team Rosters | Tokyo 2020 Olympics
 Australia, Croatia, Greece, Hungary, Italy, Japan, Kazakhstan, Montenegro, Serbia, South Africa , Spain, United States

External links
 Water Polo – Tokyo 2020 (IOC official website) 
 Tokyo 2020 (FINA official website)

Men's team rosters
2020
Water Polo Men's